Kriūkai is a small town in Marijampolė County in south-central Lithuania. According to the 2011 census, the town has a population of 291 people.

References

Towns in Lithuania
Towns in Marijampolė County
Šakiai District Municipality
Suwałki Governorate